The Second Crusade (1145–1149) was the second major crusade launched from Europe. The Second Crusade was started in response to the fall of the County of Edessa in 1144 to the forces of Zengi. The county had been founded during the First Crusade (1096–1099) by King Baldwin I of Jerusalem in 1098. While it was the first Crusader state to be founded, it was also the first to fall.

The Second Crusade was announced by Pope Eugene III, and was the first of the crusades to be led by European kings, namely Louis VII of France and Conrad III of Germany, with help from a number of other European nobles. The armies of the two kings marched separately across Europe. After crossing Byzantine territory into Anatolia, both armies were separately defeated by the Seljuk Turks. The main Western Christian source, Odo of Deuil, and Syriac Christian sources claim that the Byzantine Emperor Manuel I Komnenos secretly hindered the crusaders' progress, particularly in Anatolia, where he is alleged to have deliberately ordered Turks to attack them. However, this alleged sabotage of the Crusade by the Byzantines was likely fabricated by Odo, who saw the Empire as an obstacle, and moreover Emperor Manuel had no political reason to do so.
Louis and Conrad and the remnants of their armies reached Jerusalem and participated in 1148 in an ill-advised attack on Damascus, which ended in their retreat. In the end, the crusade in the east was a failure for the crusaders and a victory for the Muslims. It would ultimately have a key influence on the fall of Jerusalem and give rise to the Third Crusade at the end of the 12th century.

While the Second Crusade failed to achieve its goals in the Holy Land, crusaders did see victories elsewhere. The most significant of these came to a combined force of 13,000 Flemish, Frisian, Norman, English, Scottish, and German crusaders in 1147. Travelling from England, by ship, to the Holy Land, the army stopped and helped the smaller (7,000) Portuguese army in the capture of Lisbon, expelling its Moorish occupants.

Background: The fall of Edessa, Preparations

The Fall of Edessa
 After the First Crusade and the minor Crusade of 1101, there were three crusader states established in the east: the Kingdom of Jerusalem, the Principality of Antioch and the County of Edessa. A fourth, the County of Tripoli, was established in 1109. Edessa was the most northerly of these, and also the weakest and least populated; as such, it was subject to frequent attacks from the surrounding Muslim states ruled by the Ortoqids, Danishmends and Seljuq Turks. Baldwin II, then count of Edessa, and future count Joscelin of Courtenay were taken captive after their defeat at the Battle of Harran in 1104. Baldwin and Joscelin were both captured a second time in 1122, and although Edessa recovered somewhat after the Battle of Azaz in 1125, Joscelin was killed in battle in 1131. His successor Joscelin II was forced into an alliance with the Byzantine Empire, but in 1143 both the Byzantine emperor John II Comnenus and the King of Jerusalem Fulk of Anjou died. Joscelin had also quarreled with the Count of Tripoli and the Prince of Antioch, leaving Edessa with no powerful allies.

Meanwhile, Zengi, atabeg of Mosul, had added Aleppo to his rule in 1128, the key to power in Syria, contested between Mosul and Damascus. Both Zengi and Baldwin II of Jerusalem turned their attention towards Damascus; Baldwin was defeated outside the great city in 1129. Damascus, ruled by the Burid Dynasty, later allied with King Fulk when Zengi besieged the city in 1139 and 1140; the alliance was negotiated by the chronicler Usamah ibn Munqidh.

In late 1144, Joscelin II allied with the Ortoqids and marched out of Edessa with almost his entire army to support the Ortoqid army against Aleppo. Zengi, already seeking to take advantage of Fulk's death in 1143, hurried north to besiege Edessa, which fell to him after a month on 24 December 1144. Manasses of Hierges, Philip of Milly and others were sent from Jerusalem to assist, but arrived too late. Joscelin II continued to rule the remnants of the county from Turbessel, but little by little the rest of the territory was captured by Muslims or sold to the Byzantines. Zengi himself was praised throughout Islam as "defender of the faith" and al-Malik al-Mansur, "the victorious king". He did not pursue an attack on the remaining territory of Edessa, or the Principality of Antioch, as was feared. Events in Mosul compelled him to return home, and he once again set his sights on Damascus. However, he was assassinated by a slave in 1146 and was succeeded in Aleppo by his son Nur ad-Din.

Papal Bull and French Plans

The news of the fall of Edessa was brought back to Europe first by pilgrims early in 1145, and then by embassies from Antioch, Jerusalem and Armenia. Bishop Hugh of Jabala reported the news to Pope Eugene III, who issued the bull Quantum praedecessores on 1 December of that year, calling for a second crusade. Hugh also told the Pope of an eastern Christian king, who, it was hoped, would bring relief to the crusader states: this is the first documented mention of Prester John. Eugene did not control Rome and lived instead at Viterbo, but nevertheless the Second Crusade was meant to be more organized and centrally controlled than the First: the armies would be led by the strongest kings of Europe and a route would be planned beforehand.

The initial response to the new crusade bull was poor, and it in fact had to be reissued when it was clear that Louis VII of France would be taking part in the expedition. Louis VII had also been considering a new expedition independently of the Pope, which he announced to his Christmas court at Bourges in 1145. It is debatable whether Louis was planning a crusade of his own or in fact a pilgrimage, as he wanted to fulfill a vow made by his dead brother Philip to go to the Holy Land. It is probable that Louis had made this decision independently of hearing about Quantum Praedecessores. In any case, Abbot Suger and other nobles were not in favour of Louis's plans, as he would be gone from the kingdom for several years. Louis consulted Bernard of Clairvaux, who referred him back to Eugene. By now Louis would have definitely heard about the papal bull, and Eugene enthusiastically supported Louis's crusade. The bull was reissued on 1 March 1146, and Eugene authorized Bernard to preach the news throughout France.

Saint Bernard of Clairvaux

The Pope commissioned French abbot Bernard of Clairvaux to preach the Second Crusade, and granted the same indulgences for it which Pope Urban II had accorded to the First Crusade. A parliament was convoked at Vezelay in Burgundy in 1146, and Bernard preached before the assembly on 31 March. Louis VII of France, his wife, Eleanor of Aquitaine, and the princes and lords present prostrated themselves at the feet of Bernard to receive the pilgrims' cross. Bernard then passed into Germany, and the reported miracles which multiplied almost at his every step undoubtedly contributed to the success of his mission. At Speyer, Conrad III of Germany and his nephew, later Holy Roman Emperor Frederick Barbarossa, received the cross from the hand of Bernard. Pope Eugene came in person to France to encourage the enterprise.

For all his overmastering zeal, Bernard was by nature neither a bigot nor a persecutor. As in the First Crusade, the preaching inadvertently led to attacks on Jews; a fanatical French monk named Rudolf was apparently inspiring massacres of Jews in the Rhineland, Cologne, Mainz, Worms and Speyer, with Rudolf claiming Jews were not contributing financially to the rescue of the Holy Land. Bernard; Arnold I, the Archbishop of Cologne; and Henry I, the Archbishop of Mainz, were vehemently opposed to these attacks, and so Bernard traveled from Flanders to Germany to deal with the problem and quiet the mobs. Bernard then found Rudolf in Mainz and was able to silence him, returning him to his monastery.

Related European Crusades

Wendish Crusade

When the Second Crusade was called, many south Germans volunteered to crusade in the Holy Land. The north German Saxons were reluctant. They told St Bernard of their desire to campaign against pagan Slavs at an Imperial Diet meeting in Frankfurt on 13 March 1147. Approving of the Saxons' plan, Eugenius issued a papal bull known as the Divina dispensatione on 13 April. This bull stated that there was to be no difference between the spiritual rewards of the different crusaders. Those who volunteered to crusade against the pagan Slavs were primarily Danes, Saxons and Poles, although there were also some Bohemians. The Papal legate, Anselm of Havelberg, was placed in overall command. The campaign itself was led by Saxon families such as the Ascanians, Wettin and Schauenburgers.

Upset by German participation in the crusade, the Obotrites preemptively invaded Wagria in Holstein in June 1147, leading to the march of the crusaders in late summer 1147. After expelling the Obodrites from Christian territory, the crusaders targeted the Obodrite fort at Dobin and the Liutizian fort at Demmin. The forces attacking Dobin included those of the Danes Canute V and Sweyn III, Adalbert II, Archbishop of Bremen and Duke Henry the Lion of Saxony. When some crusaders advocated ravaging the countryside, others objected by asking, "Is not the land we are devastating our land, and the people we are fighting our people?" The Saxon army under Henry the Lion withdrew after the pagan chief, Niklot, agreed to have Dobin's garrison undergo baptism.

After an unsuccessful siege of Demmin, a contingent of crusaders was diverted by the margraves to attack Pomerania instead. They reached the already Christian city Stettin, whereupon the crusaders dispersed after meeting with Bishop Adalbert of Pomerania and Prince Ratibor I of Pomerania. According to Bernard of Clairvaux, the goal of the crusade was to battle the pagan Slavs "until such a time as, by God's help, they shall either be converted or deleted".

However, the crusade failed to achieve the conversion of most of the Wends. The Saxons achieved largely token conversions at Dobin, as the Slavs resorted to their pagan beliefs once the Christian armies dispersed. Albert of Pomerania explained, "If they had come to strengthen the Christian faith ... they should do so by preaching, not by arms".

By the end of the crusade, the countryside of Mecklenburg and Pomerania was plundered and depopulated with much bloodshed, especially by the troops of Henry the Lion. This was to help bring about more Christian victories in the future decades. The Slavic inhabitants also lost much of their methods of production, limiting their resistance in the future.

Reconquista and Crusading Captures of Lisbon, Almeria and Tortosa

In the spring of 1147, the Pope authorized the expansion of the crusade into the Iberian peninsula, in the context of the Reconquista. He also authorized Alfonso VII of León and Castile to equate his campaigns against the Moors with the rest of the Second Crusade. In May 1147, the first contingents of crusaders left from Dartmouth in England for the Holy Land. Bad weather forced the ships to stop on the Portuguese coast, at the northern city of Porto on 16 June 1147. There they were convinced to meet with King Afonso I of Portugal.

The crusaders agreed to help the King attack Lisbon, with a solemn agreement that offered to them the pillage of the city's goods and the ransom money for expected prisoners. However, some of the crusader forces were hesitant to help, remembering a previous failed attempt on the city by a combined force of Portuguese and northern crusaders during the Siege of Lisbon (1142). The siege of Lisbon of 1147 lasted from 1 July to 25 October when, after four months, the Moorish rulers agreed to surrender, primarily due to hunger within the city. Most of the crusaders settled in the newly captured city, but some of them set sail and continued to the Holy Land. Some of them, who had departed earlier, helped capture Santarém earlier in the same year. Later they also helped to conquer Sintra, Almada, Palmela and Setúbal, and they were allowed to stay in the conquered lands, where they settled down and had offspring.

Elsewhere on the Iberian peninsula, almost at the same time, King Alfonso VII of León, Count Ramon Berenguer IV of Barcelona, and others led a mixed army of Catalan, Leonese, Castilian and French crusaders against the rich port city of Almería. With support from a Genoese–Pisan navy, the city was occupied in October 1147.

Ramon Berenguer then invaded the lands of the Almoravid taifa kingdom of Valencia and Murcia. The fraction of the crusading forces which had aided the Portuguese in the capture of Lisbon were encouraged to participate in the proposed siege of Tortosa (1148) by the Count of Barcelona and the English Papal envoy Nicholas Breakspear. In December 1148, he captured Tortosa after a five-month siege again with the help of French, Rhenish, Flemish, Anglo-Normans and Genoese crusaders. A large number of crusader forces were rewarded with lands inside and in the vicinity of the newly captured city.  The next year, Fraga, Lleida and Mequinenza in the confluence of the Segre and Ebro rivers fell to his army.

Forces

Muslims
The professional soldiers of the Muslim states, who were usually ethnic Turks, tended to be very well-trained and equipped. The basis of the military system in the Islamic Middle East was the iqta' system of fiefs, which supported a certain number of troops in every district. In the event of war, the ahdath militias, based in the cities under the command of the ra’is (chief), and who were usually ethnic Arabs, were called upon to increase the number of troops. The ahdath militia, though less well trained than the Turkish professional troops, were often very strongly motivated by religion, especially the concept of jihad. Further support came from Turkoman and Kurdish auxiliaries, who could be called upon in times of war, though these forces were prone to indiscipline.

The principal Islamic commander was Mu'in al-Din Anur, the atabeg of Damascus from 1138 to 1149. Damascus was supposedly ruled by the Burid amirs of Damascus, but Anur, who commanded the military, was the real ruler of the city. The historian David Nicolle described Anur as an able general and diplomat, also well known as a patron of the arts. Because the Burid dynasty was displaced in 1154 by the Zangid dynasty, Anur's role in repulsing the Second Crusade has been largely erased with historians and chroniclers loyal to the Zangids giving the credit to Anur's rival, Nur ad-Din Zangi, the amir of Aleppo.

Crusaders
The German contingent comprised about 20,000 knights; the French contingent had about 700 knights from the king's lands while the nobility raised smaller numbers of knights; and the Kingdom of Jerusalem had about 950 knights and 6,000 infantrymen.

The French knights preferred to fight on horseback, while the German knights liked to fight on foot. The Byzantine Greek chronicler John Kinnamos wrote "the French are particularly capable of riding horseback in good order and attacking with the spear, and their cavalry surpasses that of the Germans in speed. The Germans, however, are able to fight on foot better than the French and excel in using the great sword".

Conrad III was considered to be a brave knight, though often described as indecisive in moments of crisis. Louis VII was a devout Christian with a sensitive side who was often attacked by contemporaries like Bernard of Clairvaux for being more in love with his wife, Eleanor of Aquitaine, than being interested in war or politics.

Stephen, King of England did not participate in the second crusade due to internal conflicts in his kingdom. Meanwhile, King David I of Scotland was dissuaded by his subjects from joining the crusade himself.

Crusade in the East

Joscelin II retook the town of Edessa and besieged the citadel following Zengi's murder, but Nur ad-Din defeated him in November 1146. On 16 February 1147, the French crusaders met at Étampes to discuss their route. The Germans had already decided to travel overland through Hungary; they regarded the sea route as politically impractical because Roger II of Sicily was an enemy of Conrad. Many of the French nobles distrusted the land route, which would take them through the Byzantine Empire, the reputation of which still suffered from the accounts of the First Crusaders. Nevertheless, the French decided to follow Conrad, and to set out on 15 June. Roger II took offence and refused to participate any longer. In France, Abbot Suger was elected by a great council at Étampes (and appointed by the Pope) to act as one of the regents during the king's absence on crusade. In Germany, further preaching was done by Adam of Ebrach, and Otto of Freising also took the cross. The Germans planned to set out at Easter, but did not leave until May.

German Route
The German crusaders, accompanied by the papal legate and cardinal Theodwin, intended to meet the French in Constantinople. Ottokar III of Styria joined Conrad at Vienna, and Conrad's enemy Géza II of Hungary allowed them to pass through unharmed. When the German army of 20,000 men arrived in Byzantine territory, Emperor Manuel I Komnenos feared they were going to attack him, and had Byzantine troops posted to ensure against trouble. A brief skirmish with some of the more unruly Germans occurred near Philippopolis and in Adrianople, where the Byzantine general Prosouch fought with Conrad's nephew, the future emperor Frederick I Barbarossa. To make matters worse, some of the German soldiers were killed in a flood at the beginning of September. On 10 September, however, they arrived at Constantinople, where relations with Manuel were poor, resulting in the Battle of Constantinople, after which the Germans became convinced that they should cross into Asia Minor as quickly as possible. Manuel wanted Conrad to leave some of his troops behind, to assist in defending against attacks from Roger II, who had taken the opportunity to plunder the cities of Greece, but Conrad did not agree, despite being a fellow enemy of Roger.

In Asia Minor, Conrad decided not to wait for the French, but marched towards Iconium, capital of the Seljuq Sultanate of Rûm. Conrad split his army into two divisions. Much of the authority of the Byzantine Empire in the western provinces of Asia Minor was more nominal than real, with much of the provinces being a no-man's land controlled by Turkish nomads. Conrad underestimated the length of the march against Anatolia, and anyhow assumed that the authority of Emperor Manuel was greater in Anatolia than was in fact the case. Conrad took the knights and the best troops with himself to march overland while sending the camp followers with Otto of Freising to follow the coastal road. The Seljuqs almost totally destroyed King Conrad's party on 25 October 1147 at the second battle of Dorylaeum.

In battle, the Turks used their typical tactic of pretending to retreat, and then returning to attack the small force of German cavalry which had separated from the main army to chase them. Conrad began a slow retreat back to Constantinople, his army harassed daily by the Turks, who attacked stragglers and defeated the rearguard. Conrad himself was wounded in a skirmish with them. The other division of the German force, led by the King's half-brother, Bishop Otto of Freising, had marched south to the Mediterranean coast and was similarly defeated early in 1148. The force led by Otto ran out of food while crossing inhospitable countryside and was ambushed by the Seljuq Turks near Laodicea on 16 November 1147. The majority of Otto's force were either killed in battle or captured and sold into slavery.

French Route

The French crusaders had departed from Metz in June 1147, led by Louis, Thierry of Alsace, Renaut I of Bar, Amadeus III of Savoy and his half-brother William V of Montferrat, William VII of Auvergne, and others, along with armies from Lorraine, Brittany, Burgundy and Aquitaine. A force from Provence, led by Alphonse of Toulouse, chose to wait until August, and to cross by sea. At Worms, Louis joined with crusaders from Normandy and England. They followed Conrad's route fairly peacefully, although Louis came into conflict with king Géza of Hungary when Géza discovered that Louis had allowed a failed Hungarian usurper, Boris Kalamanos, to join his army. Relations within Byzantine territory were also grim, and the Lorrainers, who had marched ahead of the rest of the French, also came into conflict with the slower Germans whom they met on the way.

Since the original negotiations between Louis and Manuel I, Manuel had broken off his military campaign against Rûm, signing a truce with his enemy Sultan Mesud I. Manuel did this to give himself a free hand to concentrate on defending his empire from the Crusaders, who had gained a reputation for theft and treachery since the First Crusade and were widely suspected of harbouring sinister designs on Constantinople. Nevertheless, Manuel's relations with the French army were somewhat better than with the Germans, and Louis was entertained lavishly in Constantinople. Some of the French were outraged by Manuel's truce with the Seljuqs and called for an alliance with Roger II and an attack on Constantinople, but Louis restrained them.

When the armies from Savoy, Auvergne and Montferrat joined Louis in Constantinople, having taken the land route through Italy and crossing from Brindisi to Durazzo, the entire army took ship across the Bosporus to Asia Minor. The Greeks were encouraged by rumours that the Germans had captured Iconium (Konya), but Manuel refused to give Louis any Byzantine troops. Roger II of Sicily had just invaded Byzantine territory, and Manuel needed all his army in the Peloponnese. Both the Germans and French therefore entered Asia without any Byzantine assistance, unlike the armies of the First Crusade. Following the example set by his grandfather Alexios I, Manuel had the French swear to return to the Empire any territory they captured.

The French met the remnants of Conrad's army at Lopadion, and Conrad joined Louis's force. They followed Otto of Freising's route, moving closer to the Mediterranean coast, and arrived at Ephesus in December, where they learned that the Turks were preparing to attack them. Manuel also sent ambassadors complaining about the pillaging and plundering that Louis had done along the way, and there was no guarantee that the Byzantines would assist them against the Turks. Meanwhile, Conrad fell sick and returned to Constantinople, where Manuel attended to him personally, and Louis, paying no attention to the warnings of a Turkish attack, marched out from Ephesus with the French and German survivors. The Turks were indeed waiting to attack, but in at the Battle of Ephesus on 24 December 1147, the French proved victorious. The French fended off another Turkish ambush at the Battle of the Meander in the same month.

They reached Laodicea on the Lycus early in January 1148, just after Otto of Freising's army had been destroyed in the same area. Resuming the march, the vanguard under Amadeus of Savoy became separated from the rest of the army at the Battle of Mount Cadmus, where Louis's troops suffered heavy losses from the Turks (6 January 1148). Louis himself, according to Odo of Deuil, climbed a rock and was ignored by the Turks, who did not recognize him. The Turks did not bother to attack further and the French marched on to Adalia, continually harassed from afar by the Turks, who had also burned the land to prevent the French from replenishing their food, both for themselves and their horses. Louis no longer wanted to continue by land, and it was decided to gather a fleet at Adalia and to sail for Antioch. After being delayed for a month by storms, most of the promised ships did not arrive at all. Louis and his associates claimed the ships for themselves, while the rest of the army had to resume the long march to Antioch. The army was almost entirely destroyed, either by the Turks or by sickness.

Journey to Jerusalem

Though delayed by storms, Louis eventually arrived in Antioch on 19 March; Amadeus of Savoy had died on Cyprus along the way. Louis was welcomed by Eleanor's uncle Raymond of Poitiers.

Raymond expected him to help defend against the Turks and to accompany him on an expedition against Aleppo, the Muslim city that functioned as the gateway to Edessa, but Louis refused, preferring instead to finish his pilgrimage to Jerusalem rather than focus on the military aspect of the crusade.

Eleanor enjoyed her stay, but her uncle implored her to remain to enlarge family lands and divorce Louis if the king refused to help what was assuredly the military cause of the Crusade. During this period, there were rumours of an affair between Raymond and Eleanor, which caused tensions in the marriage between Louis and Eleanor.

Louis quickly left Antioch for Tripoli with Eleanor under arrest. Meanwhile, Otto of Freising and the remnant of his troops arrived in Jerusalem early in April, and Conrad soon after. Fulk, the Latin Patriarch of Jerusalem, was sent to invite Louis to join them. The fleet that had stopped at Lisbon arrived around this time, as well as the Provençals who had left Europe under the command of Alfonso Jordan, Count of Toulouse.

Alfonso himself did not reach Jerusalem; he died at Caesarea, supposedly poisoned by Raymond II of Tripoli, the nephew who feared his political aspirations in the county. The claim that Raymond had poisoned Alfonso caused much of the Provençal force to turn back and return home. The original focus of the crusade was Edessa, but the preferred target of King Baldwin III and of the Knights Templar was Damascus.

In response to the arrival of the Crusaders, the regent of Damascus, Mu'in ad-Din Unur, started making feverish preparations for war, strengthening the fortifications of Damascus, ordering troops to his city and having the water sources along the road to Damascus destroyed or diverted. Unur sought help from the Zangid rulers of Aleppo and Mosul (who were normally his rivals), though forces from these states did not arrive in time to see combat outside of Damascus. It is almost certain that the Zangid rulers delayed sending troops to Damascus out of the hope that their rival Unur might lose his city to the Crusaders.

Council of Palmarea Near Acre

The nobility of Jerusalem welcomed the arrival of troops from Europe. A council to decide on the best target for the crusaders took place on 24 June 1148, when the Haute Cour of Jerusalem met with the recently arrived crusaders from Europe at Palmarea, near Acre, a major city of the crusader Kingdom of Jerusalem. This was the most spectacular meeting of the Court in its existence.

In the end, the decision was made to attack the city of Damascus, a former ally of the Kingdom of Jerusalem that had shifted its allegiance to that of the Zengids, and attacked the Kingdom's allied city of Bosra in 1147. Historians have long seen the decision to besiege Damascus rather than Edessa as "an act of inexplicable folly". Noting the tensions between Unur, the atabeg of Damascus, and the growing power of the Zangids, many historians have argued that it would have been better for the Crusaders to focus their energy against the Zangids. More recently, historians such as David Nicolle have defended the decision to attack Damascus, arguing that Damascus was the most powerful Muslim state in southern Syria, and that if the Christians held Damascus, they would have been in a better position to resist the rising power of Nur ad-Din. Since Unur was clearly the weaker of the two Muslim rulers, it was believed that it was inevitable that Nur ad-Din would take Damascus sometime in the near future, and thus it seemed better for the Crusaders to hold that city rather than the Zangids. In July their armies assembled at Tiberias and marched to Damascus, around the Sea of Galilee by way of Banias. There were perhaps 50,000 troops in total.

Siege of Damascus

The crusaders decided to attack Damascus from the west, where orchards would provide them with a constant food supply. They arrived at Darayya on 23 July. The following day, the Muslims were prepared for the attack and constantly attacked the army advancing through the orchards outside Damascus. The defenders had sought help from Saif ad-Din Ghazi I of Mosul and Nur ad-Din of Aleppo, who personally led an attack on the crusader camp. The crusaders were pushed back from the walls into the orchards, leaving them exposed to ambushes and guerrilla attacks.

According to William of Tyre, on 27 July the crusaders decided to move to the plain on the eastern side of the city, which was less heavily fortified but had much less food and water. It was recorded by some that Unur had bribed the leaders to move to a less defensible position, and that Unur had promised to break off his alliance with Nur ad-Din if the crusaders went home. Meanwhile, Nur ad-Din and Saif ad-Din had arrived. With Nur ad-Din in the field it was impossible for the Crusaders to return to their better position. The local crusader lords refused to carry on with the siege, and the three kings had no choice but to abandon the city. First Conrad, then the rest of the army, decided to retreat to Jerusalem on 28 July, though for their entire retreat they were followed by Turkish archers who constantly harassed them.

Aftermath

Each of the Christian forces felt betrayed by the other. A new plan was made to attack Ascalon and Conrad took his troops there, but no further help arrived, due to the lack of trust that had resulted from the failed siege. This mutual distrust would linger for a generation due to the defeat, to the ruin of the Christian kingdoms in the Holy Land. After quitting Ascalon, Conrad returned to Constantinople to further his alliance with Manuel. Louis remained behind in Jerusalem until 1149. The discord also extended to the marriage of Louis and Eleanor, which had been falling apart during the course of the Crusade. In April 1149, Louis and Eleanor, who were barely on speaking terms by this time, pointedly boarded separate ships to take them back to France.

Back in Europe, Bernard of Clairvaux was humiliated by the defeat. Bernard considered it his duty to send an apology to the Pope and it is inserted in the second part of his Book of Consideration. There he explains how the sins of the crusaders were the cause of their misfortune and failures. When his attempt to call a new crusade failed, he tried to disassociate himself from the fiasco of the Second Crusade altogether. He would die in 1153.

The cultural impact of the Second Crusade was even greater in France, with many troubadours fascinated by the alleged affair between Eleanor and Raymond, which helped to feed the theme of courtly love. Unlike Conrad, the image of Louis was improved by the Crusade with many of the French seeing him as a suffering pilgrim king who quietly bore God's punishments.

Relations between the Eastern Roman Empire and the French were badly damaged by the Crusade. Louis and other French leaders openly accused the Emperor Manuel I of colluding with Turkish attacks on them during the march across Asia Minor. The memory of the Second Crusade was to colour French views of the Byzantines for the rest of the 12th and 13th centuries. Within the empire itself, the crusade was remembered as a triumph of diplomacy. In the eulogy for the Emperor Manuel by Archbishop Eustathius of Thessalonica, it was declared:

He was able to deal with his enemies with enviable skill, playing off one against the other with the aim of bringing peace and tranquility

The preliminary Wendish Crusade achieved mixed results. While the Saxons affirmed their possession of Wagria and Polabia, pagans retained control of the Obodrite land east of Lübeck. The Saxons also received tribute from Chief Niklot, enabled the colonization of the Bishopric of Havelberg, and freed some Danish prisoners. However, the disparate Christian leaders regarded their counterparts with suspicion and accused each other of sabotaging the campaign. In Iberia, the campaigns in Spain, along with the siege of Lisbon, were some of the few lasting Christian victories of the Second Crusade. They are seen as pivotal battles of the wider Reconquista, which would be completed in 1492.

In the East the situation was much darker for the Christians. In the Holy Land, the Second Crusade had disastrous long-term consequences for Jerusalem. In 1149, the atabeg Anur died, at which point the amir Abu Sa'id Mujir al-Din Abaq Ibn Muhammad finally began to rule. The ra'is of Damascus and commander of the ahdath military Mu'ayad al-Dawhal Ibn al-Sufi feel that since his ahdath had played a major role in defeating the Second Crusade that he deserved a greater share of the power, and within two months of Anur's death was leading a rebellion against Abaq. The in-fighting within Damascus was to lead to the end of the Burid state within five years. Damascus no longer trusted the crusader kingdom and was taken by Nur ad-Din after a short siege in 1154.

Baldwin III finally seized Ascalon in 1153, which brought Egypt into the sphere of conflict. Jerusalem was able to make further advances into Egypt, briefly occupying Cairo in the 1160s. However, relations with the Byzantine Empire were mixed, and reinforcements from Europe were sparse after the disaster of the Second Crusade. King Amalric I of Jerusalem allied with the Byzantines and participated in a combined invasion of Egypt in 1169, but the expedition ultimately failed. In 1171, Saladin, nephew of one of Nur ad-Din's generals, was proclaimed Sultan of Egypt, uniting Egypt and Syria and completely surrounding the crusader kingdom. Meanwhile, the Byzantine alliance ended with the death of emperor Manuel I in 1180, and in 1187, Jerusalem capitulated to Saladin. His forces then spread north to capture all but the capital cities of the Crusader States, precipitating the Third Crusade.

Notes

References

Further reading

Primary Sources

 Osbernus. De expugniatione Lyxbonensi. The Conquest of Lisbon. Edited and translated by Charles Wendell David. Columbia University Press, 1936.
 Odo of Deuil. De profectione Ludovici VII in orientem. Edited and translated by Virginia Gingerick Berry. Columbia University Press, 1948.
 Otto of Freising. Gesta Friderici I Imperatoris. The Deeds of Frederick Barbarossa. Edited and translated by Charles Christopher Mierow. Columbia University Press, 1953.
 The Damascus Chronicle of the Crusaders, extracted and translated from the Chronicle of Ibn al-Qalanisi. Edited and translated by H. A. R. Gibb. London, 1932.
 O City of Byzantium, Annals of Niketas Choniatēs, trans. Harry J. Magoulias. Wayne State University Press, 1984.
 John Cinnamus, Deeds of John and Manuel Comnenus, trans. Charles M. Brand. Columbia University Press, 1976.

Secondary Sources

 
 Ferzoco, George. "The Origin of the Second Crusade". In Gervers (see below), and available online.
 Gervers, Michael, ed. The Second Crusade and the Cistercians. St. Martin's Press, 1992.
 Harris, Jonathan, Byzantium and the Crusades, Bloomsbury, 2nd ed., 2014. 
 Phillips, Jonathan, and Martin Hoch, eds. The Second Crusade: Scope and Consequences. Manchester University Press, 2001.
 
 Villegas-Aristizábal, Lucas, "Anglo-Norman Intervention in the Conquest and Settlement of Tortosa, 1148-1180," Crusades 8 (2009): 63–129. 
 Villegas-Aristizábal, Lucas, "Revisiting the Anglo-Norman Crusaders’ Failed Attempt to Conquer Lisbon c. 1142," Portuguese Studies 29:1 (2013), pp. 7–20.

External links

 The Second Crusade and Aftermath at the Internet Medieval Sourcebook

 
12th-century crusades
1140s conflicts
12th-century Christianity
12th century in religion
Wars involving the Fatimid Caliphate
Wars involving the Kingdom of Jerusalem
Wars involving the Holy Roman Empire
Wars involving the Byzantine Empire
1140s in the Kingdom of Jerusalem
12th century in the Fatimid Caliphate
Wars involving the Nizari Ismaili state